Summit Intermediate is a public school in Rancho Cucamonga, California. It is one of the sixteen schools of the Etiwanda School District.

History
Summit Intermediate is one of the oldest schools in the district. Summit Intermediate is one of the four middle schools in the Etiwanda School District and is located in the incorporated community of Rancho Cucamonga. Summit opened as a middle school in 1994. Before it was a middle school, it was an elementary school since 1964. Summit's feeder schools are primarily Etiwanda Colony and D.W Long. In 2013, Summit Intermediate was recognized as a "2013 California Schools To Watch" school for San Bernardino County.

References

External links
www.etiwanda.org/ Etiwanda School District
www.etiwanda.org/sis/ Etiwanda School District SIS

Middle Schools in California
Public middle schools in California
Schools in San Bernardino County, California